National Highway 6 & Economic Corridor 1 (EC1) (commonly referred to as NH6), was a National Highway in India that has been separately designated under the new national highway numbering system. It was officially listed as running over from Surat to Kolkata. The route was also known as Asian Highway 46 (AH46) & Mumbai - Kolkata Highway  and Great Eastern Highway.

NH6 ran through Gujarat, Maharashtra, Chhattisgarh, Odisha, Jharkhand and West Bengal state in India.  The highway passed through the cities of Surat, Dhule, Jalgaon, Bhusaval,Khamgaon , Akola, Amravati, Nagpur, Bhandara, Rajnandgaon, Durg, Raipur, Mahasamund, Sambalpur, Kharagpur, Kolkata.

New numbering 
As of 2010 notification from Ministry of Road Transport and Highways, old NH 6 has been renumbered as follows.

 Hajira - Deogarh section is part of new National Highway No. 53

 Deogarh - Kharagpur section is part of new National Highway No. 49

 Kharagpur - Kolaghat - Kolkata section is part of new National Highway No. 16

Junctions
 At Palsana, Gujarat Near Surat with NH 8 connecting Delhi - Jaipur - Ahmedabad - Mumbai
 At Dhule with NH 3 connecting Agra - Indore - Mumbai
 At Dhule with NH 211 connecting Solapur - Aurangabad - Dhule
 At Akola with NH 161 connecting Akola - Nanded - Sangareddy - Hyderabad
 At Akola with NH 161A connecting Akot - Akola - Digras - Mudkhed - Nanded - 
 At Nagpur with National Highway 7 (India)(old numbering) connecting Varanasi - Jabalpur - Nagpur - Hyderabad - Bangalore - Kanyakumari
 At Nagpur with NH 69 connecting Nagpur - Betul - Obedullaganj near Bhopal
 At Raipur with NH 43 connecting Raipur - Jagdalpur - Borigumma - Koraput - Salur - Vizianagaram on NH 5
 At Raipur with NH 200 connecting Raipur - Bilaspur - Raigarh - Deogarh- Talcher - Chandikhol
 At Raipur with NH 217 connecting Raipur - Titlagarh - Asika - Gopalpur
 At Bargarh with NH 201 connecting Borigumma on NH 43 - Bhawanipatna - Balangir - Bargarh
 At Sambalpur with NH 42 connecting Sambalpur - Angul - Dhenkanal - Cuttack on NH 5
 Near Deogarh with NH 200 ( for Second time ) connecting Raipur - Bilaspur - Raigarh - Deogarh - Talcher - Chandikhol on NH 5
 Near Barkote with NH 23 connecting Chas on NH 32 - Ranchi - Raurkela - Barkote - Pal Lahara - Talcher - Nauhata on NH 42
 At Pal Lahara with NH 23 connecting Chas on NH 32 - Ranchi - Raurkela - Barkote - Pal Lahara - Talcher - Nauhata on NH 42
 At Kendujhargarh with NH 215 connecting Panikoili - Anandapur - Kendujhargarh - Rajamunda on NH 23
 At Jharpokharia with NH 5 connectioning Jharpokharia - Cuttack - Vijayawada - Chennai
 At Baharagora with NH 33 connecting Baharagora - Jamshedpur - Ranchi - Hazaribag - Barhi on NH 2
 At Kharagpur with NH 60 connecting Balasore on NH 5 - Jaleswar - Kharagpur - Bankura - Raniganj - junction with NH 2
 At Kolaghat with NH 41 connecting Tamluk - Haldia
 At Bally 15 km from Kolkata with NH 2 connecting Bally - Varanasi - Kanpur - Delhi
 At Kona 8 km from Kolkata with National Highway 117 connecting Kona - Vidyasagar Setu - Kolkata - Diamond Harbour - Bakkhali

Asian Highway
This highway crossed the AH47 at Dhule  and Asian Highway 43 at Nagpur.

States, districts, cities, towns and villages connected

Many cities and towns in various districts in the States of Gujarat, Maharashtra, Chhattisgarh, Odisha, Jharkhand and West Bengal were connected by National Highway 6.

Gujarat
Surat district
Hazira - Surat - Sachin, Gujarat - Palsana - Bardoli
Tapi district
Bajipura - Vyara - Songadh

Maharashtra
Nandurbar District
Navapur - Visarwadi - Kondaibari
Dhule District
Dahivel - Sakri - Shevali - Ner Dhule - Kusumba - Dhule - Phagne - Mukati
Jalgaon District
Parola - - Erandol - Paldhi - Varad - Jalgaon- Nashirabad - Bhusawal - Varangaon - Muktainagar
Buldhana District
Chikhali - Malkapur - Wadner - Nandura - Khamgaon
Akola District
Balapur - Akola - BorgaonManju - Kurankhed - Murtajapur
Amravati District
Loni - Badnera - Amravati - Kholapur - Nandgaon Peth - Mozri - Tiwsa
Wardha District
Talegaon Shyamji Pant - Karanja
Nagpur District
Kondhali - Bazargaon - Nagpur - Itwari - Mouda
Bhandara District
Bhandara - Kardha - Lakhani - Sakoli
Gondia District
Kohmara - Duggipar - Deori

Chhattisgarh
Rajnandgaon District
 Baghnadi - Chichola - Rajnandgaon
Durg District
Durg - Bhilai
Raipur District
Raipur - Arang
Mahasamund District
Mahasamund - Pithora - Sankra - Basna - Saraipali - Singhora

Odisha
Bargarh District
 Loharachatti - Sohela - Bargarh - Attabira godhbhaga
Sambalpur District
Burla - Sambalpur - Ushakothi - Jamankira
Debagarh District
Deogarh - Balam - Barkote
Angul District
Pal Lahara
Kendujhargarh District
 Govindpur - Kuanr - Kendujhargarh
Mayurbhanj District
Jashipur - Manda - Bangriposi - Jharpokharia

Jharkhand
East Singhbhum District
Baharagora

West Bengal

Paschim Medinipur District
Jhargram(Chichira - Feko - Lodhashuli - Manikpara) - Kharagpur - Debra 
Purba Medinipur District
Panskura - Kolaghat
Howrah District
Samta - Bagnan - Uluberia - Panchla - Mahiari - Jagacha - Howrah
Kolkata District
Kolkata

Trivia
 The stretch between Barkote and Pal Lahara was common between NH6 and NH 23
 NH 200 crossed NH6 at two locations: one at its starting point at Raipur and second at Deogarh

See also
 List of National Highways in India (by Highway Number)

References

External links
 Old NH 6 on OpenStreetMap
 NH 6 on Google Maps
 NH 6 on MapsofIndia

Asian Highway Network
6
6
6
6
6
6
6
National highways in India (old numbering)
Transport in Sambalpur
Transport in Surat
Rajnandgaon